Paul Girod (27 June 1931 – 28 September 2021) was a French politician.

Biography
After studying engineering, Girod took over his uncle's farm in Aisne. He was elected mayor of Droizy in 1958 and served until his death. In 1988, he was elected to serve the Canton of Oulchy-le-Château in the Departmental Council of Aisne, of which he served as President from 1988 to 1998. He also served as Vice-President of the Regional Council of Picardy from 1985 to 1988.

On 7 May 1978, Girod was appointed to the Senate following the appointment of Jacques Pelletier to the cabinet of Prime Minister Raymond Barre. He was re-elected in 1980, 1989, and 1998. He served as Vice-President of the Senate from 1995 to 2001. He was also a member of the Parliamentary Office for the Evaluation of Scientific and Technological Choices. He retired from the Senate in 2008.

Girod died in Droizy on 28 September 2021. At the time of his death, he was the longest-serving mayor in France, having been in office for 63 years.

References

1931 births
2021 deaths
People from Boulogne-Billancourt
French Senators of the Fifth Republic
Presidents of French departments
Senators of Aisne
21st-century French politicians
20th-century French politicians
Mayors of places in Hauts-de-France
Popular Republican Movement politicians
Democratic Centre (France) politicians
Centre of Social Democrats politicians
Union for a Popular Movement politicians
Union for French Democracy politicians
Democratic Force (France) politicians
The Republicans (France) politicians